ڳ,  (Arabic letter gueh (U+06B3)),  is an additional letter of the Arabic script, not used in the Arabic alphabet itself but used in Sindhi and Saraiki to represent a voiced velar implosive, . It is written as ॻ in Saraiki and Sindhi's Devanagari orthography

Forms
The Arabic letter Gueh, or ⟨⟩, has 4 forms in total. They are:

Compound of ڳ 

The velar nasal is a type of consonantal sound, used in Sindhi and Saraiki language and other some spoken languages. It is compound of ⟨⟩ and ⟨⟩. It is the sound of ng in English sing . Both the IPA symbol and the sound are commonly called 'eng' or 'engma'.

See also
ٻ
ڄ
ݙ
ݨ

References

External links
 Saraiki Omniglot
 Saraiki Alphabet

Arabic letters